Kryštof Harant of Polžice and Bezdružice (1564 – 21 June 1621) was a Czech nobleman, traveler, humanist, soldier, writer and composer. He joined the Protestant Bohemian Revolt in the Lands of the Bohemian Crown against the House of Habsburg that led to Thirty Years' War. Following the victory of Catholic forces in the Battle of White Mountain, Harant was executed in the mass Old Town Square execution by the Habsburgs.

As a composer he represented the school of Franco-Flemish polyphony in Bohemia. Harant is also noted for his expedition to the Middle East summarized in a travel book Journey from Bohemia to the Holy Land, by way of Venice and the Sea (1608).

Life
Harant was born at Klenová Castle, near Klatovy, western Bohemia. From 1576 he studied singing and counterpoint as a member of a local court band at Innsbruck, at the court of Archduke Ferdinand II, learning 7 languages, discovering his talent for music and the other arts and his interest in history, geography and political science. He returned to Bohemia in 1584 in a vain attempt to get a post at the court of Rudolf II, and so enlisted as a soldier, participating in the 1593 and 1597 campaign against the Turks. In 1589 he married Eva Czernin von Chudenitz – they had two children before she died in 1597. Kryštof married two more times. Leaving his relation Lidmila Markvartová z Hrádku to raise the children, in 1598 and 1599 he went to the Holy Land as a pilgrim, wishing to visit the Holy Sepulchre with Eva's brother Hermann. He wrote about his experiences in a book entitled Journey from Bohemia to the Holy Land, by way of Venice and the Sea which was published in Prague in 1608.

After his return, in 1599, he was given a post in the emperor's court and simultaneously raised to the peerage, though both his children died that year. In 1601 he was made an advisor to the court of Rudolf and his successor Matthias and part of the imperial chambers. When the imperial court moved to Vienna, Harant was granted the Pecka Castle and dedicated himself for some years to music, becoming the most important Bohemian composer of the time. During 1614-15 he travelled to Spain with a diplomatic mission.

In 1618 he converted to Protestantism, returned to Prague, joined the forces arrayed against the Catholics as an artillery officer and fought on the side of the Bohemian states during the uprisings. In 1619 he became the commissioner of the military unit of Mladá Boleslav, Kouřim and Hradec Králové, and was involved in a 50,000 strong regiment in the unsuccessful march on imperial Vienna. During the rebellion he bombarded the imperial palace in Vienna—with the emperor inside—which proved to be a bad move.

After Frederick V succeeded to the Palatinate, he was appointed as a privy councillor and president of the Bohemian chamber, though this career was short-lived. After the defeat of the Protestant Czechs at the Battle of White Mountain in 1620 by the combined arms of Maximilian and Tilly, the subsequent sack of Prague by Imperial troops, and the assumption of office by the Emperor Ferdinand II, Harant withdrew to his castle. He was captured there by Albrecht von Wallenstein, arrested and taken to Prague, unsuccessfully pleading for mercy. As one of the twenty-seven Bohemian noble rebels, he was condemned to death and beheaded on 21 June 1621 by Jan Mydlář in the Old Town Square, Prague, along with all the other leaders of the insurrection.

His widow Anna Salomena (born von Horschitz, who had married Kryštof) in 1625 married Hermann Czernin von Chudenitz, Eva's brother.

Music and influence 
Harant's music was conservative, and in the style of the Netherlands composers of the previous generation. He used archaic techniques such as cantus firmus mass composition. Seven separate works survived, all sacred vocal compositions (the rest were lost when his property was confiscated as being that of an executed traitor). One of his pieces is a cantus firmus mass based on a madrigal by Marenzio (Missa quinis vocibus super Dolorosi martir)—a musical irony in that it combines a technique which went out of fashion a hundred years before with the music of one of Italy's most popular and progressive composers.

Harant had a reputation as a fine instrumentalist and singer in addition to being a composer. In another irony, one of his Roman Catholic masses was performed in 1620, just before his execution, in a Catholic church in Prague, to great ceremony.

Musical works
 Missa quinis vocibus super Dolorosi martir – to the theme of madrigal by L. Marenzio "Dolorosi martir, fieri tormenti". The mass was published in 1905-6 by Czech musicologist Zdeněk Nejedlý.
 Motet Maria Kron, die Engel schon – for five voices, to the German text, 1604
 Motet Qui confidunt in Domino – for six voices, composed in Jerusalem, 1598

Fragments:
Dejž tobě Pán Bůh štěstí – Czech wedding song
Dies est laetitiae – an arrangement of a Christmas song for eight voices
Motet Psallite Domino in cythara – for five voices
Motet Qui vult venire post me – for five voices

The complete works of Kryštof Harant were published in 1956, by Czechoslovak publishing house KLHU.

Literature
Journey from Bohemia to the Holy Land, by way of Venice and the Sea (1608)

References

Further reading

 Article "Kryštof Harant z Polžic a Bezdružic", in The New Grove Dictionary of Music and Musicians, ed. Stanley Sadie. 20 vol. London, Macmillan Publishers Ltd., 1980. 
 Gustave Reese, Music in the Renaissance. New York, W.W. Norton & Co., 1954. 
 Qui confidunt in Domino on youtube.com as performed by Prague Chamber Choir

External links 

 Exposition of Kryštof Harant in the Bezdružice Castle
 Biography 
 Dolorosi martir project with Harant Mass 
 Recordings of K.Harant Opera Omnia
 Partial recording of cantus-firmus mass based on Marenzio madrigal
 

1564 births
1621 deaths
16th-century Bohemian people
17th-century Bohemian people
Czech Renaissance humanists
16th-century classical composers
17th-century classical composers
Czech Baroque composers
Renaissance composers
Czech male classical composers
Classical composers of church music
16th-century writers
17th-century writers
Czech male writers
Czech explorers
Czech Protestants
Converts to Protestantism
Bohemian nobility
Executed revolutionaries
Executed Czech people
People from Klatovy District
People executed by Austria by hanging
People executed in the Holy Roman Empire by decapitation
Holy Land travellers
16th-century Bohemian writers
17th-century Bohemian writers
17th-century executions in the Holy Roman Empire
17th-century male musicians